Anatumomab mafenatox is a mouse monoclonal antibody studied for the treatment non-small cell lung cancer, which acts as a tumor-targeted superantigen.

It is a fusion protein of a human tumor-associated 5T4 antigen monoclonal IgG1 Fab fragment with an enterotoxin ('mafenatox') of Staphylococcus aureus.

Development was abandoned in 2005.

References

Monoclonal antibodies for tumors
Abandoned drugs
Antibody-drug conjugates